Part of Global Affairs Canada, the Canadian Trade Commissioner Service (TCS) is a network of more than 1000 trade professionals working in Canadian embassies, high commissions, and consulates located in 161 cities around the world and with offices across Canada.

Role
The Trade Commissioner Services helps companies that are looking to export, invest abroad, attract investment abroad or develop innovation and R&D partnerships. They provide advice on marketing strategies and up to date market and sector information to help smooth a Canadian company's path to doing business abroad.

Services for Canadian businesses
The Canadian Trade Commissioner Service offers four key services which are designed to support the growth of Canadian companies internationally.

The four key services are:
 Preparing Canadian companies for international markets
 Providing an assessment of the company's potential in a target market through the use of market intelligence and providing advice on market strategies
 Finding qualified contacts
 Resolving problems and business challenges

Services for non-Canadian businesses
Global Affairs Canada (formerly the Department of Foreign Affairs and International Trade) also offers assistance to foreign companies interested in doing business in Canada. The Invest in Canada bureau is tasked with promoting, attracting and retaining foreign direct investment in Canada.

History
Created in 1894, the Canadian Trade Commissioner Service (TCS) has 125 years of experience helping Canadian companies succeed in foreign markets by promoting the economic interests of Canada in the global marketplace.

Since Canada's first Trade Commissioner's posting to Australia in 1895, the role of the TCS has become increasingly critical and of higher value within an ever evolving global economy. Canada's active and successful participation in the global economy impacts all Canadians. Consider that a fifth of all jobs in this country are directly linked to international trade and half of what we manufacture in Canada is exported.

See also
Minister of International Trade (Canada) (1983 – present)
List of Canadian diplomats
Canadexport - e-magazine of the Trade Commissioner Service

References

External links

Website: Business Women in International Trade

Federal departments and agencies of Canada